"Trust" is the third single released by Ayumi Hamasaki on August 5, 1998. It was her first single to enter the Top Ten of the Oricon weekly charts.

Track listing
 "Trust"
 "Trust" (Acoustic Version)
 "Trust" (Instrumental)

Re-release
This single was re-released on February 28, 2001, featuring 4 new songs.

Track listing
 "Trust"
 "Trust" (Acoustic Version)
 "Powder Snow" (Dee Mix)
 "Trust" (Dj Soma Grow Sound Mix)
 "Trust" (Eddy Yamamoto Club Mix)
 "Trust" (Groove That Soul Mix)
 "Trust" (Instrumental)

Live performances
August 7, 1998 – Music Station - Trust
August 10, 1998 – Hey! Hey! Hey! - Trust
August 25, 1998 – Utaban - Trust
September 5, 1998 – Pop Jam - Trust
November 21, 1998 - All Japan Request Awards - Trust
December 4, 1998 – Japan Cable Awards - Trust

Chart positions

1Original version
²Re-release version

Oricon sales: 181,820 (original version)

References

External links
 Trust information at Avex Network.
 Trust re-release information at Avex Network.
 Trust information at Oricon.
 Trust re-release information at Oricon.

Ayumi Hamasaki songs
1998 singles
2001 singles
Songs written by Ayumi Hamasaki
1998 songs
Avex Trax singles